Alaminos Airport, also known as Hundred Islands International Airport, in the Philippines got its approval in 2007, but its location was not decided upon until 2009 within the area of Alaminos, Pangasinan. Construction began in March 2010 and it was expected to open for domestic flights by 2012-13, but then set for 2016-17 and for international flights by 2022, encompassing an area of 158.5 ha within the barangays of Sabangan, Pandan, and Telbang. It has an estimated cost of 3.9 billion Philippine pesos. Currently the project has been stalled for various reasons.

References 

Airports in the Philippines
Transportation in Pangasinan
Buildings and structures in Pangasinan